Paul Ivano, ASC (May 13, 1900 – April 9, 1984), was a Serbian–French–American cinematographer whose career stretched from 1920 into the late 1960s. Born Paul Ivano Ivanichevitch, to Serbian parents in Nice, France, he served for two years with the Franco–American Ambulance Corps and the American Red Cross Ambulance Corps, between 1916 and 1918. After the conclusion of World War I, he remained in the Balkans, acting as a photographer and interpreter for the American Red Cross. He arrived in the United States in 1919, and moved to California, the following year. In 1947 he was the cameraman who made the first aerial helicopter shots for an American feature film in Nicholas Ray's film noir They Live by Night.

Select filmography

Television
The Lawless Years

References

External links

 
 
 
 
 The Paul Ivano Papers at the Academy of Motion Picture Arts and Sciences′ Margaret Herrick Library′s Special Collections

1900 births
1984 deaths
French cinematographers
French people of Serbian descent
People from Nice
French emigrants to the United States